Euschistus quadrator is a species in the family Pentatomidae ("stink bugs"), in the order Hemiptera ("true bugs, cicadas, hoppers, aphids and allies").
The distribution range of Euschistus quadrator includes Central America and North America.

References

Further reading
 
 Catalog of the Heteroptera, True Bugs of Canada and the Continental United States, Thomas J. Henry, Richard C. Froeschner. 1988. Brill Academic Publishers.
 Henry, Thomas J., and Richard C. Froeschner, eds. (1988). Catalog of the Heteroptera, or True Bugs, of Canada and the Continental United States, xix + 958.

External links

Insects described in 1874
Pentatomini